X8 or X-8 may refer to:
 Sehol X8, mid-size crossover SUV produced by JAC Motors
 X8 (New York City bus)
 X8, a Metrobus route
X8 protein domain
 Electrologica X8, a digital computer 
 Mega Man X8, a video game
 Piaggio X8, an Italian-made motor scooter
 Roland Fantom-X8, a synthesizer keyboard by Roland 
 Rockman X8 Original Soundtrack, the music of the video game
 WrestleMania X8, a catch event
 WWE WrestleMania X8, a video game designed on the former
 Icaro Air, an Ecuadorian airline which IATA airline code is X8
 Sony Ericsson Xperia X8, a smartphone
 Aerojet General X-8, a missile
 X-8 (artist), American artist and publisher
 Motorola X8 Mobile Computing System, a chipset
 SubhX8,a DJ